Chaosbound is an epic fantasy novel by American writer David Farland, the  eighth book in his series The Runelords. It was published on October 13, 2009.

Plot introduction
Chaosbound is an epic fantasy novel set in a land where men can bestow to each other a number of endowments, granting the recipient of the endowment some attributes such as increased strength, a more acute sense of hearing, or better eyesight.  The novel combines traditional sword and sorcery elements of fantasy with its own unique magic system of endowments.

Plot summary

Borenson & Myrrima arrive back from Landesfallen following the binding of the worlds, at Ox Port, where they are hunted by the wyrmlings, but surreptitiously helped and protected by the local wyrmling leader, Crull-maldor, who hopes to aid Borenson/Aaath Ulber in his prophesied destruction of the emperor Zul-Torac, clearing the way for Crull-maldor to replace him as Lord Despair's side. The wight exacts vengeance on Borenson/Aaath Ulber after his successful, endowment-aided destruction of the wyrmling forces and lair, by murdering Myrrima.

References

American fantasy novels
Runelords series
2009 American novels
Tor Books books